Sean Dillon may refer to:

Seán Dillon, Irish footballer
Sean Dillon (Jack Higgins character), fictional character in stories by Jack Higgins
 Sean Dillon, fictional character in British TV series Ballykissangel

See also 
Shaun Dillon, Scottish footballer